Brian Lewerke (born October 24, 1996) is an American football quarterback who is a free agent. He played college football at Michigan State University.

Early years
Lewerke attended Pinnacle High School in Phoenix, Arizona. During his career he had 7,090 yards and 87 touchdowns total. He committed to Michigan State University to play college football.

College career

2016 season
After redshirting his first year at Michigan State in 2015, Lewerke appeared in four games and made two starts as a redshirt freshman in 2016. His season ended in October after suffering a broken tibia after being tackled by Jabrill Peppers in a game against Michigan. He finished the season completing 31 of his 57 passing attempts for 381 yards, including two touchdowns and an interception.

2017 season
Lewerke entered the 2017 season as the starting quarterback for the team. He finished his 2017 redshirt sophomore season with 246 completions out of 417 passing attempts, 2793 total yards, 20 touchdowns, and 9 interceptions . Lewerke and the Spartans, who were ranked #19 at the time, also went on to beat Washington State, the #21 ranked team at the time, 42-17 in the 2017 Holiday Bowl, in which Lewerke earned the Offensive MVP award. The Spartans finished the season 10–3, with a final ranking of #15 in the AP poll.

2018 season
In his junior season, Lewerke completed 189 out of his 339 passing attempts, threw for 2,040 yards and 8 touchdowns, and threw 11 interceptions. He also ran 90 times for 184 yards and 2 touchdowns, and was sacked 19 times. This gave him a 54.3 completion percentage and a passer rating of 106.1. That season, the Spartans went 7-6 overall, and 5-4 in the Big Ten Conference. The Spartans also made an appearance in the 2018 Redbox Bowl, losing 7-6 to the Oregon Ducks.

2019 season
In his senior season, Lewerke completed 234 out of his 399 passing attempts, threw for 2,759 yards and 16 touchdowns, and threw 12 interceptions. He also ran 100 times for 317 yards and 2 touchdowns, and was sacked 17 times. He had a 58.6 completion percentage for the season and a passer rating of 124.0. That season, the Spartans went 7-6 overall, and 4-5 in the Big Ten Conference. The Spartans also made an appearance in the 2019 Pinstripe Bowl, winning 27-21 over the Wake Forest Demon Deacons, in which Lewerke won the MVP award. During this game, Lewerke surpassed former quarterback Connor Cook to become the school's all-time leader in total yards from scrimmage.

Professional career

New England Patriots
Lewerke went undrafted in the 2020 NFL Draft. On May 5, 2020, Lewerke was signed by the New England Patriots as an undrafted free agent. On July 26, 2020, he was waived before training camp opened, but re-signed with the team four days later. He was waived on September 5, 2020.

Lewerke signed with the Alphas of The Spring League in May 2021.

New York Giants
On August 16, 2021, Lewerke signed with the New York Giants. He was waived on August 31, 2021 and re-signed to the practice squad. On January 8, 2022, Lewerke was promoted for the teams season finale against the Washington Football Team after injuries to Daniel Jones and Mike Glennon. He signed a reserve/futures contract with the Giants on January 10, 2022.

On May 18, 2022, Lewerke was waived.

Seattle Sea Dragons 
On November 15, 2022, Lewerke was assigned to the Seattle Sea Dragons of the XFL. He was released on January 21, 2023.

References

External links
Michigan State Spartans bio

1996 births
Living people
Players of American football from Phoenix, Arizona
American football quarterbacks
Michigan State Spartans football players
New England Patriots players
The Spring League players
New York Giants players